Ethnic Heritage Ensemble is an American jazz ensemble founded in 1973 by percussionist Kahil El'Zabar. Its members have included Kalaparusha Maurice McIntyre, Joseph Bowie, Ernest Dawkins, Light Henry Huff, Edward Wilkerson,  Hanah Jon Taylor, and 'Atu' Harold Murray.

They have released over a dozen albums, the latest one being in 2019.

Discography
 Three Gentlemen from Chicago (Moers, 1981)
 Impressions (Red, 1982)
 Welcome (Leo, 1984)
 Ancestral Song — Live from Stockholm (Silkheart, 1988)
 Hang Tuff (Open Minds, 1991)
 Dance with the Ancestors (Chameleon, 1993)
 21st Century Union March (Silkheart, 1997)
 The Continuum (Delmark, 1997)
 Papa's Bounce (CIMP, 1998)
 Freedom Jazz Dance (Delmark, 1999)
 Ka-Real (Silkheart, 2000)
 Hot 'N' Heavy — Live at the Ascension Loft (Delmark, 2007)
 Mama's House (Katalyst, 2009)
 Black is Back: 40th Anniversary Project (Katalyst, 2014)
 Be Known — Ancient/Future/Music (Spiritmuse, 2019)

References

Delmark Records artists
American jazz ensembles
Post-bop ensembles
Moers Music artists
Avant-garde jazz ensembles